Majajan is a 2006 Pakistani Punjabi drama film directed by Syed Noor which was released across theaters in Pakistan on 24 March 2006. Majajan is a love story Syed Noor says he "made most passionately". Inspired by the life of Baba Bulleh Shah and his 'Ishq' with his 'Murshad'.

The film was a huge success and celebrated its diamond jubilee at the Pakistani cinemas. The film's success led to the creation of a sequel title Zill-e-Shah, which was released in 2008.

Synopsis
Zil-e-Shah (Shaan), an unhappily married man who belongs to the Syed clan, falls in love with a courtesan, by the name of Taari (Saima) who arrives to perform in his village. His wife (Madiha Shah) and family condemn their relationship.

Release
The film was released on 24 March 2006, across Pakistan.

Majajan has celebrated Diamond Jubilee (100 weeks) in Lahore's cinemas. It also did Solo Silver Jubilees on its two main cinemas Metropole and Sozo Gold in Lahore.

Inspiration
In a newspaper interview, director Syed Noor said, ""When I read the verses of Baba Bulleh Shah I promised myself that I will make a film on the great Sufi poet's 'ishq' and I was looking for an opportunity to do that. So, I discussed the story with my wife (Rukhsana Noor) who is also a writer. She converted it into a full-fledged script and finally I created Majajan... (Saima) didn't compromise on quality, and spent lavishly on making Majajan a great film".

Majajan's soundtrack consists of 10 songs of which only half have been used. The director said Shaan is playing this kind of role for the first time. Music is composed by the music director Zulfiqar Ali and film song lyrics are by Khawaja Pervez, the Sufi poet Bulleh Shah and Aqeel Rubi.

Cast
 Shaan Shahid as  Zil-e-Shah
 Saima as Taari
 Madiha Shah
 Saud
 Shafqat Cheema
 Iftikhar Thakur
 Goshi Khan
 Sardar Kamal
 Sher Khan
 Rashid Mehmood

Sequel

Awards

See also
 Syed Noor
 Jhoomar
 Lollywood

References

External links
 

Punjabi-language Pakistani films
2006 films
Pakistani romance films
Films directed by Syed Noor
2000s Punjabi-language films
2000s romance films
Lux Style Award winners